William Blackstone (1723–1780) was an English jurist.

William Blackstone may also refer to:

 William Seymour Blackstone (1809–1881), his grandson, MP for Wallingford
 William Blaxton, sometimes spelled Blackstone (1595–1675), early New England settler
 William E. Blackstone (1841–1935), American Christian Zionist
 William Blackstone, the name sometimes attributed to Billy Higgins (vaudeville) (1888–1937), songwriter and vaudeville comedian
 Statue of William Blackstone, Washington, D.C.
 William T. Blackstone, American academic and philosopher

See also
 Blackstone (disambiguation)